A notepad is a pad of paper for writing down notes.

Notepad may also refer to:

 Windows Notepad, a plain text editor included with Microsoft Windows
 Text editor, a type of software also known as "notepad"
 Notepad+, a freeware text editor for Windows developed in 1996
 Notepad++, a text editor for Windows developed in 2003

See also
 Notebook (disambiguation)
 Scratchpad (disambiguation)